Hot Country Songs is a chart that ranks the top-performing country music songs in the United States, published by Billboard magazine.  In 2008, 26 different songs topped the chart in 52 issues of the magazine, based on weekly airplay data from country music radio stations compiled by Nielsen Broadcast Data Systems.

At the start of the year the number one was "Our Song" by Taylor Swift, which had risen to the top in the issue dated December 22, 2007.  It remained at the top of the chart until the issue dated February 2, when it was replaced by "Letter to Me" by Brad Paisley.  Both Swift and Paisley had three songs at number one in 2008.  Paisley reached the top with "Letter to Me", "I'm Still a Guy" and "Waitin' on a Woman" and Swift with "Our Song", "Should've Said No" and "Love Story".  Carrie Underwood also had three chart-toppers in 2008 with "All-American Girl", "Last Name" and "Just a Dream".  Paisley and Swift tied for the most weeks at number one by an artist in the year, each spending eight weeks at the top.  The last number one of the year was "Roll with Me", the final number one single by Montgomery Gentry.

Four acts topped the chart for the first time in 2008.  The first was James Otto, who reached number one for the first time in May with "Just Got Started Lovin' You".  Although it only spent two weeks at number one, Otto's song was ranked number one on Billboard's year-end chart of the most popular country songs.  In October, former Hootie & the Blowfish frontman Darius Rucker scored his first country number one with "Don't Think I Don't Think About It", making him the first African-American to have a solo number one since Charley Pride in 1983.  Jimmy Wayne and the Zac Brown Band also topped the chart for the first time in 2008.  Additionally, veteran reggae band The Wailers received a secondary credit on Kenny Chesney's song "Everybody Wants to Go to Heaven" for one of its two weeks in the top spot.  This gave the group its first appearance at number one on Hot Country Songs and marked the first appearance at number one on the chart by any act of the reggae genre and the first by any act from Jamaica.

Chart history

See also
2008 in music
List of artists who reached number one on the U.S. country chart

References

2008
United States Country Singles
2008 in American music